Putnok is a district in north-western part of Borsod-Abaúj-Zemplén County. Putnok is also the name of the town where the district seat is found. The district is located in the Northern Hungary Statistical Region.

Geography 
Putnok District borders with the Slovakian regions of Banská Bystrica and Košice to the northwest, Edelény District and Kazincbarcika District to the east, Ózd District to the south. The number of the inhabited places in Putnok District is 26.

Municipalities 
The district has 1 town and 25 villages.
(ordered by population, as of 1 January 2012)

The bolded municipality is the city.

Demographics

In 2011, it had a population of 19,290 and the population density was 49/km².

Ethnicity
Besides the Hungarian majority, the main minority is the Roma (approx. 1,500).

Total population (2011 census): 19,290
Ethnic groups (2011 census): Identified themselves: 18,547 persons:
Hungarians: 16,821 (90.69%)
Gypsies: 1,573 (8.48%)
Others and indefinable: 153 (0.82%)
Approx. 1,000 persons in Putnok District did not declare their ethnic group at the 2011 census.

Religion
Religious adherence in the county according to 2011 census:

Catholic – 7,027 (Roman Catholic – 6,735; Greek Catholic – 291); 
Reformed – 5,326;
Evangelical – 107;
other religions – 347; 
Non-religious – 2,148; 
Atheism – 79;
Undeclared – 4,256.

Gallery

See also

List of cities and towns of Hungary

References

External links
 Postal codes of the Putnok District

Districts in Borsod-Abaúj-Zemplén County